Hossein abad (also Romanized as Hossein abad) is a village in Shamkan Rural District, Sheshtomad District, Sabzevar County, Razavi Khorasan Province, Iran. At the 2006 census, its population was 779, in 198 families. Sabzevar, Neyshabur, Mashhad and Aşgabat are the closest major cities.

References 

Populated places in Sabzevar County